is a Japanese actress, writer, producer and film director. She has produced over ten films and acted in such movies as Hospitalité, Chigasaki Story and Snow Woman. In 2014 she directed the film Yokudō which later went on to win awards at the Tallinn Black Nights Film Festival and the Hong Kong Asian Film Festival.

Biography
Sugino was born in Hiroshima in 1984 to a family of Korean descent. She studied Economics at Keio University and traveled to South Korea as an exchange student where she appeared in her first film One Shining Day. In 2010 Sugino worked with Japanese director Koji Fukada to produce and act in the comedy film Hospitalité which won an award at the Tokyo International Film Festival and was screened at nearly 100 film festivals internationally.

Sugino made her directorial debut in 2014 with the comedy film Kyoto Elegy which was shot in just eleven days and premiered at the Tokyo International Film Festival to positive reviews. Two years later she directed the film Snow Woman, a retelling of the Japanese folklore tale Yuki-onna.

Filmography

As director

As actress

References

External links

Living people
Japanese women film directors
Japanese women screenwriters
1984 births
Japanese film actresses
Actors from Hiroshima
Japanese actresses of Korean descent